Jefferson Township is an inactive township in Monroe County, in the U.S. state of Missouri.

Jefferson Township was established in 1831, taking its name from President Thomas Jefferson.

References

Townships in Missouri
Townships in Monroe County, Missouri